Allobates gasconi is a species of frog in the family Dendrobatidae.
It is endemic to the Acre and Amazonas states of Brazil.
Its natural habitats are tropical moist lowland forests and rivers.
It is threatened by habitat loss.

References

gasconi
Endemic fauna of Brazil
Amphibians of Brazil
Taxonomy articles created by Polbot
Amphibians described in 2002